Burke is an unincorporated community in Grant County, in the U.S. state of Washington.

History
A post office called Burke was established in 1907, and remained in operation until 1925. James M. Burke, an early postmaster, gave the community his name.

References

Unincorporated communities in Grant County, Washington
Unincorporated communities in Washington (state)